Cat Scratch Fever is the third studio album by American rock musician Ted Nugent. It was released on May 13, 1977, by Epic Records. Vocalist Derek St. Holmes, who had left the band during the recording of the album Free-for-All, had come back for touring in 1976 and was again the principal lead singer on this album.

A commercial success, the album has been certified multi-platinum by the RIAA. Nugent released his next album, Double Live Gonzo!, the following year.

Reception 

Cat Scratch Fever received a mostly positive review from Greg Prato of AllMusic, who remarked that it "matched the focused ferocity of Nugent's excellent 1975 debut", proclaiming it a "first-rate set of brash hard rockers".

Track listing
All songs written by Ted Nugent, except "Live It Up" (written by Nugent and Derek St. Holmes). All songs arranged by Nugent, Rob Grange, St. Holmes, and Cliff Davies.

Personnel
Band members
Derek St. Holmes – rhythm and lead guitar, lead and backing vocals, arrangements
Ted Nugent – lead and rhythm guitar, backing and lead (1, 2, 7) vocals, percussion
Rob Grange – bass guitar, backing vocals, arrangements
Cliff Davies – drums, backing vocals, arrangements, producer

Additional musicians
Alan Spenner, Boz Burrell, Rory Dodd – backing vocals
Montego Joe – percussion
Tom Werman – percussion, backing vocals, producer

Production
Lew Futterman – producer
Tim Geelan, Wayne Tarnowski – engineers
Jim Houghton, Robert Alford, Ron Pownall – photography
Bruce Dickinson – 1999 reissue producer
Vic Anesini – remastering
Howard Fritzson – 1999 reissue art director
Gary Graff – 1999 reissue liner notes

Charts

Album

Singles

Certifications

References

1977 albums
Ted Nugent albums
Albums produced by Tom Werman
Epic Records albums